The Bishop Subbasin is an aquifer that resides between two subsurface structures of the Tassajara Formation in the northern extremity of the Amador Valley, California.   This aquifer is a sub-unit of the Livermore-Amador Groundwater Basin.  The Bishop Subbasin is associated with the locale of San Ramon, California in Contra Costa County.  The Bishop Subbasin along with the Mocho Subbasin is one of the aquifers in the Livermore Valley that has been studied the most heavily for benefits of injection of reclaimed reverse osmosis waters.

See also
South San Ramon Creek
Arroyo de la Laguna

References

External links
What are the projected impacts of injecting reclaimed, reverse osmosis water into the Livermore-Amador Groundwater Basin?

Aquifers in California
Bodies of water of Contra Costa County, California
Livermore Valley
San Ramon, California
Geology of Contra Costa County, California